The 1st Canadian Women's Hockey League All-Star Game, took place on December 13, 2014 at Air Canada Centre in Toronto, Ontario, Canada. Admission was free, and 6,850 people attended the game. The game aired live on Sportsnet One in Canada, as well as on the NHL Network in the United States. The event featured three 15-minute periods which aired on television, and had a Skills Competition following the game.

This edition of the All-Star Game featured a "fantasy draft" format akin to the NHL All-Star Game in order to determine the rosters. Fan balloting determined the team captains, which were goaltender Charline Labonte from the Montreal Stars, and rookie forward Jessica Campbell of the Calgary Inferno. The captains each chose 5 players for their team, and picked the remainder of their teams via mini-stick draw.

While this game was promoted as the first All-Star Game, there were in fact two previous All-Star Games played during the 2008-09 season. These two games featured CWHL All-Stars against NHL Alumni.

Rosters

Fan balloting
Voting for CWHL all-star captains started on November 21, 2014. Online voting will require fans to vote on the CWHL.com web site. Fans were presented a list of 42 players.

Draft
The draft of the players took place on December 12, 2014 at 8:00 pm, Eastern time. It was held at the Delta Hotel in Toronto.

Brianna Decker of the Boston Blades and Courtney Birchard of the Brampton Thunder were selected for the All-Star Game, however both were unable to participate.

Game summary

Team White's Natalie Spooner of the Toronto Furies opened the scoring late in the first period, putting a loose puck behind Team Red Captain Charline Labonte. Haley Irwin picked up an assist on the opening marker. Team White added to their lead in the second period, as Kelli Stack scored on Christina Kessler. Stack's Boston Blades teammate Hilary Knight and Natalie Spooner got assists on the goal. Sami Jo Small of the Toronto Furies and Delayne Brian of the Calgary Inferno had shutouts for Team White in the first and second periods respectively.

Team Red came out quickly in the Third period, as Montreal Stars forward Lisa-Marie Breton-Lebreux scored early in the period on Team White's Genevieve Lacasse with Blake Bolden and Ann-Sophie Bettez assisting on the goal. Jamie Lee Rattray tied the game up a few minutes later for Team Red on a feed from Emmanuelle Blais. Rebecca Johnston of the Calgary Inferno would give Team Red the lead midway through the third, beating her Canada women's national ice hockey team teammate Geneviève Lacasse on a mini-breakaway. Jenelle Kohanchuk and Ann-Sophie Bettez assisted on the eventual game winner. Team Red's Jessica Wong from the Calgary Inferno picked up the only penalty of the game late in the third period for tripping, however Team White was unable to beat Team Red goalie Erica Howe on the 6-on-4 power play.

Skills competition
Following the game, Joe Bowen hosted the Skills Competition. The first part of the event was the Fastest Skater competition. Team White won the 5-heat event 3–2, with Jessica Campbell, Michelle Bonello and Carly Hill winning their heats. Rebecca Johnston and Jessica Wong won the two heats for Team Red. The second part of the Skills Competition was the Breakaway Relay, an elimination shootout featuring the skaters who didn't compete in the Fastest Skater event. Team Red won after Megan Bozek scored after everyone else had been eliminated. Genevieve Lacasse did take an attempt for Team White, however she was stopped by Erica Howe.

References 

Canadian Women's Hockey League
2014 Canadian Womens Hockey League All-Star Game
All-Star Game
2014 in Ontario
2010s in Toronto